The John Partridge House is a historic house in Millis, Massachusetts.  It is a -story wood-frame house, five bays wide, with a side-gable roof, large central chimney, a front entry with Greek Revival surround.  It was built in the second half of the 17th century (the exact date being disputed), and is among the oldest buildings in the town.  John Partridge, Sr. or his son John, Jr. was its likely builder, the former having been granted the land in 1659.

The house was listed on the National Register of Historic Places in 1974.

See also
List of the oldest buildings in Massachusetts
National Register of Historic Places listings in Norfolk County, Massachusetts

References

Houses completed in 1659
Houses in Norfolk County, Massachusetts
Houses on the National Register of Historic Places in Norfolk County, Massachusetts
1659 establishments in Massachusetts
First period houses in Massachusetts (1620–1659)
Buildings and structures in Millis, Massachusetts